Rahmatabad (also Romanized as Raḩmatābād) is a village in Rezvan Rural District, Ferdows District, Rafsanjan County, Kerman Province, Iran. At the 2006 census, its population was 37, in 13 families.

References 

Populated places in Rafsanjan County